KSE Meezan Index (KMI–30) is a stock market index on the Pakistan Stock Exchange in Pakistan of thirty companies that have been screened for Islamic Shariah criteria. The index was introduced in 2009 and the base period for this Islamic index is 30 June 2008. It was created as a joint effort by the Karachi Stock Exchange (now known as Pakistan Stock Exchange) and Al-Meezan Investment Bank (now known as Meezan Bank Limited).
 
The index is calculated using free float market capitalization. At any point in time, the level of the index reflects the free float market value of selected Shariah-compliant shares in comparison with the base period. KMI-30 is recomposed semi-annually.

Guidance is taken from qualified and well reputed Shariah experts when Shariah compliance of stocks is done.

Shariah compliance test
For any stock to be "Shariah compliant" it must meet all of the following six criteria:

 Business of the company
 Debt to total assets
 Illiquid assets to total assets
 Net liquid assets to share price
 Non-compliant investments to total assets
 Non-compliant income to total revenue

List of companies
The following list of companies are included in the KMI-30 index as per the notice from Pakistan Stock Exchange dated 03 Jul 2020. The recomposed index is implemented w.e.f Monday, July 13, 2020. This re- composition of KSE-Meezan 30 Index is for the review period from July 01, 2019 to December 31, 2019.

See also
 KSE-30
 KSE-100

References

External links 

 Impact of Interest Rate, Inflation Rate, Exchange Rate and Gold Prices on Karachi Meezan Index 30

Pakistani stock market indices
Pakistan Stock Exchange